This is a list of the characters in the Underdog series.

Underdog
Underdog is an anthropomorphic dog, who is a superhero parody of Superman and similar heroes with secret identities. The premise was that "humble and lovable" Shoeshine Boy, a cartoon dog, was in truth the superhero Underdog. When villains threatened, Shoeshine Boy ducked into a telephone booth where he transformed into the caped and costumed hero, destroying the booth in the process when his superpowers were activated. In the live action film, he appeared as a beagle who became Jack Unger's pet. In 2008, he appeared in a Super Bowl advertisement for Coca-Cola.

Underdog is voiced by Wally Cox in the television cartoon. In the film adaptation, he is voiced by Jason Lee and portrayed onscreen by a lemon beagle named Leo sporting a red sweater and a blue cape.

Allies

Sweet Polly Purebred
Sweet Polly Purebred is a female anthropomorphic dog TV news reporter and Underdog's love interest; she serves as the damsel in distress of most episodes. When being pursued by an antagonist, Polly is apt to start singing, "Oh where, oh where has my Underdog gone? Oh where, oh where can he be?", in a whiny voice, hoping for the object of her affections to come and rescue her. Polly's face is slightly similar to that of Underdog's, with a large muzzle and nose, she wears her platinum blonde hair styled in a pageboy, and her wardrobe consists of a black skirt, white shirt, red sweater, and black high-heels. In a few episodes it is hinted that Polly shows her love for Underdog. For example, in the episode "March of the Monsters", she is caught by a robot and calls for Underdog. He then saves Polly, but after Underdog uses his supersonic hi-fi voice and breaks all the glass, the townspeople complain about his voice. However, Polly defends the hero and tells the people that they should thank him for saving everyone from the robots. She then goes to reward Underdog with a big kiss, but the hero backs away and flies off. Also, in the episode "The Vacuum Gun", when Polly is caught by Simon Bar Sinister's vacuum gun, she calls for Underdog and her song annoys Simon. Later in the episode, she retrieves Underdog's ring.

In the live-action film, Polly is a Cavalier King Charles Spaniel owned by a girl named Molly, a classmate of Underdog/Shoeshine's owner, Jack. She is based upon Superman's romantic interest Lois Lane.

In the 1976 Western Comics Underdog #7, it is revealed that Sweet Polly has a young nephew named Wilbur.

She was voiced by Norma MacMillan in the cartoon and voiced by Amy Adams in the live-action film.

Dan Unger
Appearances: Movie

Dan Unger is Jack's father. He was once a police officer, but quit the force after his wife died and worked as a security guard at the scientific institute where Simon Bar Sinister hid out after hours. Using Underdog's stolen collar, Simon and Cad were able to determine where he lived and captured him in order to lure Jack and Underdog to them. After Simon Bar Sinister fed an antidote pill to Underdog and left to forcefully negotiate with the Mayor, Dan learned that Shoeshine was Underdog. After Underdog freed the Mayor, Dan was reinstated and promoted by the Mayor and helped Underdog arrest Simon while Underdog buried a bomb Cad placed on the roof. Dan was later seen placing Simon into solitary confinement where Cad was also held.

In the movie, he is portrayed by James Belushi.

General Brainley
Appearances: Weathering the Storm

General Brainley is in charge of the moon launch at Cape Canaveral. When he was about to send a pair of astronauts and Sweet Polly to the moon, Simon Bar Sinister and Cad Lackey hijacked the spaceship and held Sweet Polly prisoner so they could use the Weather Machine against Earth. When anything goes awry, he deems the problem an outrage.

He is voiced by Allen Swift.

Jack Unger
Appearances: Movie

Jack Unger is Underdog's human companion. He is a teenager and Dan Unger's son. His mother has died some time ago. Although Dan is very understanding, Jack's relationship with him is not very smooth. When Dan brings him the dog Shoeshine which he found in the street, Jack at first does not want him. When the dog talks to him, he is understandably upset and wonders whether he is going crazy. However, soon he decides he wants to keep him.

After Shoeshine defends Molly (Jack's classmate and the teenage female owner of the female dog he fancies) against robbers, Jack convinces him to use his powers to fight more evil, arguing that one cannot always just do what one likes. They decide that for his superhero actions Shoeshine takes on the secret identity of "Underdog", using Dan's college sweater, which has a big U on it, as his hero attire.

Jack is played by Alex Neuberger.

O.J. Skweez
Appearances: Fearo, From Hopeless to Helpless, The Gold Bricks, The Phoney Booths, RiffRaffville, The Vacuum Gun

O.J. Skweez is the owner of the TTV (Total Television) building and is Sweet Polly's employer.

He is voiced by Mort Marshall.

Professor Moby Von Ahab
Appearances: The Bubbleheads

Professor Moby Von Ahab is one of the world's leading scientists who helped Sweet Polly investigate what was happening beneath the sea when the Bubblehead Empire planned to conquer the surface world. His name is a take-off on both Moby-Dick and Captain Ahab.

He is voiced by Allen Swift.

Officer Flim Flanigan
Appearances: A New Villain, Batty-Man 

Officer Flim Flanigan previously appeared frequently on the King Leonardo and His Short Subjects segment "The Hunter". He was included as the chief of police during later episodes.

Villains

Simon Bar Sinister
Appearances: Simon Says, Go Snow, Zot, The Big Shrink, Weathering The Storm, The Phoney Booths, The Forget-Me-Net, Simon Says "No Thanksgiving", The Tickle Feather Machine, The Big Dipper, Simon Says "Be My Valentine", The Vacuum Gun, movie

Simon Bar Sinister is a mad scientist. He is the wickedest man in the world who precedes all his commands with “Simon Says” and has an assistant named Cad Lackey. A "bend sinister", sometimes, inaccurately, called a "bar sinister", is a diagonal line in heraldry that can indicate that the bearer is a bastard by birth. At the same time, "bar" means "son of" in Aramaic.  In fact, in scripture, "Simon bar Jonah" became the Apostle Peter.  It was Simon's ambition to rule the world, but each time, Underdog defeated him.

He was voiced by Allen Swift impersonating Lionel Barrymore in the cartoon. In the movie, he is portrayed by Peter Dinklage.

Cad Lackey
Appearances: Go Snow, The Big Shrink, Weathering The Storm, The Phoney Booths, The Forget-Me-Net, Simon Says "No Thanksgiving", The Tickle Feather Machine, The Big Dipper, Simon Says "Be My Valentine", The Vacuum Gun, movie

Cad Lackey was Simon's henchman, who, though generally dull-witted, was occasionally capable of pointing out flaws in his boss's plans. Contrary to the mad scientist stereotype, Simon actually paid good attention to Cad's suggestions in these episodes.

In the live-action film, he was portrayed as more intelligent and level-headed. He was Simon's partner and the security guard of a building where Simon hid out after hours.

He is voiced by Ben Stone impersonating Humphrey Bogart in the cartoon. In the movie, he is portrayed by Patrick Warburton.

Riff Raff
Appearances: The Great Gold Robbery, Fearo, From Hopeless to Helpless, The Gold Bricks, Pain Strikes Underdog, Whistler's Father, RiffRaffville, Just In Case, The Vacuum Gun, movie

Riff Raff is an anthropomorphic wolf gangster. He leads an unnamed gang that often carry out various crime waves until they are stopped by Underdog. In "The Vacuum Gun," Riff Raff and his gang were among the criminals that were recruited by Simon Bar Sinister.

In the film, Riff Raff is portrayed as a Rottweiler. When he meets Shoeshine, he and his dog henchmen chase him around an alley in an attempt to eat him until he is found by Dan Unger, when they run away. They meet again with Polly (whom Riff Raff tries to flirt with) on the sidewalk. Around the end of the film, Shoeshine barks at Riff Raff enough to remove some of his fur and he and his henchmen run away again for the last time. In contrast to his role as a major villain on the series, Riff Raff is portrayed as more of a comic relief minor villain.

Riff Raff is voiced by Allen Swift impersonating George Raft in the cartoon. In the film, Riff Raff was voiced by Brad Garrett.

Riff Raff's gang
In addition to some unnamed members, the following are members of Riff Raff's gang:

Dinah Mite 
Appearances: Whistler's Father

Dinah Mite is one of the criminals Riff Raff summoned in the episode "Whistler's Father". She is the best bomb-tosser in the crime business.

Mooch 
Appearances: The Great Gold Robbery, Fearo, From Hopeless to Helpless, Pain Strikes Underdog, Whistler's Father, RiffRaffville, The Vacuum Gun

Mooch is the top gunman in Riff Raff's gang and is Riff Raff's right-hand man.

He is modeled after Walter Matthau and voiced by George S. Irving.

Nails the Carpenter 
Appearances: Just in Case

Nails the Carpenter is one of the new members of Riff Raff's gang. He rebuilt the sunken ship of Captain Kidd as part of Riff Raff's ghost ship plot.

Needles the Tailor 
Appearances: Just In Case

Needles the Tailor is one of the new members of Riff Raff's gang. He sewed a sail as part of Riff Raff's ghost ship plot.

Sandy the Safecracker 
Appearances: Whistler's Father, Riffraffville, The Vacuum Gun

Sandy the Safecracker is the best at breaking banks. He just opens safes with his fingers.

Smitty the Blacksmith 
Appearances: Just In Case

Smitty the Blacksmith is one of the new members of Riff Raff's gang. He hammered out an anchor as part of Riff Raff's ghost ship plot.

Voiced by George S. Irving.

Spinny Wheels 
Appearances: Whistler's Father, Riffraffville, The Vacuum Gun

Spinny Wheels is the best getaway car driver in the crime business.

Witch Doctor 
Appearances: Just In Case

The Witch Doctor is one of the new members of Riff Raff's gang. He was the disguised prisoner who went with Riff Raff during the prison break. When asked by Nails, Needles, and Smitty why they should bring him along during the prison break and give him a share of the loot, Riff Raff kept telling them "Just In Case". When Sweet Polly Purebred ends up captured during her infiltration, Riff Raff reveals the disguised prisoner to be a Witch Doctor. When Underdog arrives, the Witch Doctor puts Underdog under a voodoo spell which was instantly broken by Underdog taking his Super Energy Pill.

Voiced by George S. Irving.

Other villains

Batty-Man
Appearances: Batty-Man, The Vacuum Gun

Batty-Man (voiced by Allen Swift) is a vampire villain who commands a massive army of giant bats and lives in Belfrey Castle.

In "Batty-Man", he and his batty army have caused a crime wave nationwide. Underdog, the police, and everyone in the country were baffled because of these crime waves. The crime wave was arranged to make Underdog powerless enough so Batty-Man cannot be stopped from pulling the crime of the century. Soon, Underdog found out Batty-Man was the crook behind the crime wave after Sweet Polly was taken captive. Underdog had to rescue her and defeat Batty-Man, but he failed and was captured. Batty-Man later planned to steal all the gold in Fort Knox and use it to go to Europe by turning the gold into bowling balls. Underdog and Polly escaped before they could get turned into bowling balls and defeated Batty-Man. Everything was then returned to its rightful owners.

Batty-Man was later freed from prison by Simon Bar Sinister. He, along with Riff Raff and the Electric Eel were enlisted to help Simon with his Vacuum Gun plan which Underdog later stopped.

In the 1987 Spotlight Comics Underdog #2, Batty-Man was at home watching the news when he noticed Sweet Polly. He instantly fell in love with Sweet Polly and ordered his right-hand man Georgie and his bat minions to kidnap Sweet Polly and bring her over to his castle in order to woo her. But Sweet Polly did not return his feelings and Batty-Man ordered Georgie to take her down to the catacombs. Shoeshine heard Polly's cries for help and changed into Underdog to rescue her. After Polly was rescued, Batty-Man said to her that "their love was never meant to be."

Georgie
Georgie (voiced by George S. Irving) is Batty-Man's assistant.

The Bubblehead Empire
Appearances: The Bubbleheads

The Bubblehead Empire is a society of people who all wear air helmets and live under the sea, in the city of Maldemare (the name being a take-off on the French phrase mal de mer, meaning “seasickness”). They command sea creatures to do their bidding and deal with their prisoners by feeding them to a giant clam. The city is ruled by the Bubblehead Emperor who in turn was ruled by the Bubblehead Empress.

The Bubblehead Empress was tired of living under the sea, so she wanted to take over the dry land. The Bubblehead scientists worked to destroy the land, using earthquakes and volcanoes, but those two evil plans were foiled by Underdog. As a result, the two scientists were fed to the Giant Clam. The third evil plot was to use a machine creating a tidal wave powerful enough to destroy the Earth. Soon, everybody around the world was aware that something peculiar was happening to the ocean. Sweet Polly Purebred, with the aid from one of the world's leading scientists Professor Moby Von Ahab (the name being a take-off on both Captain Ahab and Moby Dick), investigated what was happening under the sea, but were eventually captured and tossed into the giant clam. Underdog got word that his friends were held captive, rescued Sweet Polly and the Professor and destroyed the tidal wave machine.

Irving and Ralph
Appearances: Zot

Irving and Ralph are a two-headed dragon that are known as the legendary enemies of the planet Zot. For every task they do, they do it with teamwork as noted by the quote "Teamwork! Teamwork! That's what counts!". When they attacked while Underdog was to forcibly wed Glissando, Princess of Zot, Underdog easily defeated them and they promised never to bother Zot's inhabitants again. Upon their defeat, Underdog was allowed to return home to Earth, knowing that he had helped Glissando find her future husband: Zot's Prime Minister.

The Magnet Men
Appearances: The Magnet Men, The Flying Sorcerers

The Magnet Men are evil robots from another planet. The Magnet Men feed on metal. They demanded that the Earth give them all of its metal. When the Earth refuses, the Magnet Men use their Great Gravity Gun to pull the Earth towards them. As the Earth moves away from the Sun, the planet plunges into a deep freeze. Underdog defeats the Magnet Men, destroys the Great Gravity Gun, and puts the Earth back in its correct position in space.

In "The Flying Sorcerers," one Magnet Man was abducted by Prince Bric and Prince Brac to make a cake for their father King Cup. Unfortunately, all cakes the Magnet Men make are made of metal.

The Marbleheads
Appearances: The Marbleheads

The Marbleheads are people made of marble. Captain Marblehead (voiced by Allen Swift) is the dictator of their planet. Captain Marblehead holds their most powerful weapon, the Granite Gun, that could turn anyone into solid stone and used it on Underdog, but to Marblehead's shock he breaks free. Underdog defeats the Marbleheads and the Granite Gun and frees all the slaves.

The Molemen
Appearances: The Molemen

The Molemen are an evil society of giant moles who live underground, led by the evil King Mange (voiced by Allen Swift). They plan to conquer the world by stealing all the food in the world, thus making everyone weak, sluggish and without energy. With this advantage, the Molemen and their giant ants would have no problem conquering the world. Other giant bugs under the Molemens' ownership include a giant caterpillar who encased Underdog and Polly in a cocoon, and a giant spider who attempts to trap them in a web.

As Sweet Polly was investigating the thefts, she was captured by King Mange and Underdog was called to rescue her, but he succumbed to the Mole-Hole Gun, the Molemen's secret weapon. Afterwards, he was captured. King Mange threatened to destroy Sweet Polly if Underdog did not do what Mange said. Underdog got Sweet Polly free and soon had the answer to everyone's energy problems. He filled every water reservoir in the world with his Super Energy Pills, filling the water with tremendous energy. Soon afterward, the citizens had enough energy to escape the Molemen's attack and the Army had the strength to fight. King Mange was eventually defeated and arrested.

Overcat
Appearances: Underdog vs. Overcat

Overcat (voiced by Allen Swift) is a giant anthropomorphic cat who was once the infamous ruler of the planet Felina. He is a bully, very arrogant and also has all of Underdog's powers.

One day on Felina, the milk wells ran dry, so Overcat stole the cows from the Earth, kidnapped Sweet Polly Purebred and forced her to milk the cows so the giant cats of Felina can have a lifetime supply of milk. After Underdog rescued Polly and the cows, Overcat challenged Underdog to a winner-take-all fight. Unless Underdog fought Overcat, the giant cats of Felina would destroy the Earth. As Underdog fought Overcat, it appeared Overcat had the upper-hand, but due to Overcat's size and lack of speed, Underdog came out the victor. Underdog promised the giant cats of Felina to give them milk growing from coconut trees if the giant cats banished Overcat from Felina and let the other worlds live as they pleased. Underdog carried out the promise and all the cats were happy, because with the coconut trees, the cats will not run out of milk. After being banished from Felina, Overcat swore he would find another planet to conquer, train harder to become stronger and one day return to Earth to wipe out Underdog. Despite this, Overcat was never seen in the series again afterwards.

Slippery Eel (a.k.a. The Electric Eel)
Appearances: A New Villain, The Vacuum Gun

Slippery Eel is one of the world's most dangerous criminals. He got the name The Electric Eel after he was electrified by the gates of the prison's electric fence while he was trying to escape. After being electrified, he gained the power to control electricity.

Electric Eel was the only villain who ever actually defeated Underdog, using his electrical powers and apparently killing Underdog. However, before he "died", Underdog requested that he not be thrown into the lake. Eel, being the villain that he was, naturally decided to throw Underdog into the lake – which drained the electricity from Underdog's body and restored him to "life", whereupon he polished off Eel and his gang. Eel was then confined in a glass prison cell.

In "The Vacuum Gun," Electric Eel and his gang were recruited by Simon Bar Sinister when he found Eel's sewer hideout.

Tap Tap the Chiseler
Appearances: From Hopeless to Helpless, Tricky Trap by Tap Tap 

Tap Tap the Chiseler is a criminal that chisels jewelry, making them into smaller pieces of jewelry. He bears an amazing resemblance to Underdog, and Tap Tap can use this advantage to impersonate Underdog. However, unlike Underdog, he does not speak in rhyme. He also seems to be close friends with Riff Raff. He is voiced by George S. Irving.

In "From Hopeless to Helpless", after Riff Raff stole the Hopeless Diamond, Tap Tap was hired to help cut it into little pieces so that Riff Raff could sell it and impersonate Underdog in order to commit crimes all over town. Everyone, including Sweet Polly (this is the only episode in the series where even she begin to doubt about Underdog, due to her being fooled by Tap Tap and mistaking him for Underdog after he snatched her purse), thought Underdog had turned to crime and he was sent to jail, much to Underdog's shock. Tap Tap pulled off the crimes so excellently that even Underdog (thanks to Sweet Polly's biased lecturing) was convinced he was guilty, believing that he had sleepwalked when the crimes were committed. However, Riff Raff needed Underdog to break the Hopeless Diamond into a million pieces after Tap Tap had failed to cut it, so they broke Underdog out of jail and told Underdog that Tap Tap had imitated him and framed him for the crimes all over town. Now knowing that Tap Tap had been responsible for the crimes that were supposedly committed by him, Underdog pretended to really turn to crime in order to fool the gang. When he finally retrieved the Hopeless Diamond from Riff Raff, Mooch and Tap Tap, he apprehended them and explained to the townspeople, including Sweet Polly, how Tap Tap had imitated him and framed him for the crimes. The townspeople, including Sweet Polly apologized to Underdog for the misunderstanding and falsely accusing him, and prior to the episode "Tricky Trap by Tap Tap", Tap Tap was sent to prison.

At that point, Tap Tap once again disguised himself as Underdog again and broke out of jail on the same day Underdog was visiting the prison. Part of his plan was to first purchase a bomb from a bomb factory and borrow a policeman's handcuffs. He used the handcuffs to cuff himself to Sweet Polly and threatened to use the bomb to blow himself and Sweet Polly to bits if Underdog did not do what he said. Underdog stopped him by melting the handcuffs with his cosmic vision, then tackling Tap Tap, accidentally detonating the bomb in the process. Underdog was, of course, unharmed, while Tap Tap was left singed and dazed.

Wicked Witch of Pickyoon
Appearances: The Witch of Pickyoon

The Wicked Witch of Pickyoon is an evil witch who rules over the strange land of the Pickyoons and has enslaved all who inhabit the land. She lives in a castle in the mountains of Pickyoon.

She wishes to be the most powerful being in all of Pickyoon and she was-that is, until Underdog came along. She planned to capture Sweet Polly and put Underdog in her power. She put a spell on Sweet Polly, causing her to fall asleep for 1,000 years. The Witch was the only one who knew how to break the spell (although, everybody knows the only way to break a spell is as if the hero kisses someone under the spell). If she was going to tell Underdog how to undo the spell, he had to perform three tasks: steal water, steal diamonds and help her assemble an army to conquer the world. Unless Underdog helped the Witch with those tasks, she would not break the spell that had been cast on Sweet Polly. Underdog refused to accomplish the tasks, for it would make him as wicked as the Witch. But every time Underdog refused to do the tasks, the Witch reminded him that Polly would sleep for 1,000 years unless he did what she said. Underdog struck water by burrowing through the underground depths of Pickyoon and made diamonds out of coal. Soon, all that was left was to help the Witch conquer the world. When Underdog refused to perform the final task, he eventually got into a fight with the Witch. After the fight, the Witch disappeared forever after Underdog destroyed her broom. Afterwards, Underdog awakened Polly with a kiss and the people of Pickyoon were freed from the Witch's power.

Zorm
Appearances: Round and Round

Zorm is the ruler of a strange planet. He plans to take over the world, but in order to do that, he needs to keep Underdog from interfering. He sent Cron to Earth. Cron put a charm around Underdog's neck, causing him to fall under his dizzy spell when he is standing up. But when Underdog sits down, he feels perfectly fine. Underdog eventually got the charm off of him and foiled Zorm's plan.

Cron
Appearances: Round and Round

Cron is Zorm's henchman.

Reformed villains
The following villains gave up their evil plans after being thwarted by Underdog:

The Cloud Men
Appearances: The Silver Thieves

The Cloud Men are a race of ghost-like creatures. They live on the Planet Cumulus and are led by King Cumulus Regulus (voiced by Allen Swift). When people "interfere with them" by "attacking them", they lightning jolt them by shooting out electric bolts from their fingers that turn them into silver statues. They steal all the silver on Earth, including Underdog's ring, because everything they have is made of gold and "every Cloud Man must have a silver lining". When Underdog and Sweet Polly head for a conveyor belt, Underdog finds his ring and takes his Underdog Super Energy Pill, then defeats the Cloud Men. In the end, the Cloud Men trade gold for silver with the Earth.

The Flying Sorcerers
Appearances: The Flying Sorcerers

The Flying Sorcerers are a strange alien race led by King Cup (voiced by Allen Swift).

King Cup sent his twin sons Prince Bric and Prince Brac to find someone who can bake a cake for his people after the old royal baker was fired for his cake not being good. The first two baking slaves they found upon King Cup firing a dart at three possible planets were a Magnet Man and an inhabitant of Zot, but they could not bake a cake that tasted like cake (the Magnet Man's cake was made of metal and the Zot's cake didn't taste good) and were imprisoned. Then they made Sweet Polly their new baking slave. Before Underdog could rescue her, Bric and Brac transformed him into a bouncing ball. Sweet Polly was forced to bake 500 cakes for the Flying Sorcerers, but her weariness from baking the cakes made her fall into the giant mixing bowl she was using to make the cakes. Underdog freed himself from Bric and Brac's spell and defeated the Flying Sorcerers. At first, King Cup was upset that Underdog was taking his baking slave home, but after vowing he would not abuse others again, he received one of Sweet Polly's cake recipes so that he could make cakes for his people.

Other characters

Helen Patterson
Appearances: Film

Helen Patterson is the Principal of Molly and Jack's school.

She is portrayed by Samantha Bee.

References

Underdog